Sourabhee Debbarma (born 1985) is an Indian singer who was a contestant on the Indian Idol 4, where she became the first female winner. She is also a Guinness World record holder. She is a singer, performer and entertainer who performed live concerts and has performed across India and abroad in countries like Hong Kong, Nigeria, Durban, New York City, London, Kuwait, Bangladesh and Nepal.

Personal life 
Sourabhee Debbarma is born in 1985 to a couple from Tripura. Even though Sourabhee's parents are government employees and disconnected from the world of music, they have been supportive of her decision and encouraged her. She had done her education in St Paul's School, Agartala.

Guinness World Record 
Sourabhee Debbarma, the first female Indian Idol who hailed from Tripura breaks the Guinness World Record and made to the list of Guinness Book of World Record. In the telecast on 18 March on a private TV channel, the former "Indian Idol" winner Sourabhee Debbarma attempted to sing a song hanging upside down. She took the challenge to break the existing record of New Zealand's Rebecca Wright, who sang upside down for 3 Min 53 seconds. She sang for 4 minutes and 30 seconds. Sourabhee has always been extremely interested in Music and was found performing in all college events when she was a student of ASMs College of Commerce Science and Information Technology CSIT.

References

External links
 Sourabhee Debbarma Official Website

1985 births
Living people
Indian women pop singers
Tripuri people
People from Agartala
Indian Idol participants
Indian Idol winners
Idols (TV series) winners
21st-century Indian women singers
21st-century Indian singers
Singers from Tripura
Women musicians from Tripura

Kokborok playback singers
Tripuri actors
Kokborok-language film directors